

sk-sn
Skelaxin 
Skelex
Skelid 
Skin Exposure Reduction Paste Against Chemical Warfare Agents 
Sleep-Aid
Sleep-eze 3 Oral
Sleepinal
Sleepwell 2-nite
Slim-Mint
Slo-Bid 
Slo-Niacin
Slo-Phyllin 
Slo-Salt
Slow-K 
Slow-Mag
Slow-Trasicor
SMX-TMP
Snaplets-EX

so

sob
sobetirome (USAN)
sobuzoxane (INN)

sod

sode
sodelglitazar (USAN)

sodi

sodiu

sodium
sodium a-sodium f
sodium acetrizoate (INN)
sodium amidotrizoate (INN)
sodium apolate (INN)
sodium ascorbate (INN)
sodium aurothiomalate (INN)
sodium aurotiosulfate (INN)
sodium bitionolate (INN)
sodium borocaptate (10 B) (INN)
sodium calcium edetate (INN)
sodium chromate (51 Cr) (INN)
sodium cyclamate (INN)
sodium dehydrocholate (INN)
sodium dibunate (INN)
sodium diprotrizoate (INN)
sodium etasulfate (INN)
sodium feredetate (INN)
sodium ferric gluconate complex (USAN)
sodium g-sodium t
sodium gentisate (INN)
sodium glucaspaldrate (INN)
sodium gualenate (INN)
sodium hexacyclonate (INN)
sodium iodide (125 I) (INN)
sodium iodide (131 I) (INN)
sodium iodohippurate (131 I) (INN)
sodium iopodate (INN)
sodium iotalamate (125 I) (INN)
sodium iotalamate (131 I) (INN)
sodium metrizoate (INN)
sodium morrhuate (INN)
Sodium P.A.S. 
sodium phosphate (32 P) (INN)
sodium picofosfate (INN)
sodium picosulfate (INN)
Sodium Polyphosphate-Tin Kit 
sodium stibocaptate (INN)
sodium stibogluconate (INN)
sodium sulamyd (INN)
sodium tetradecyl sulfate (INN)
sodium timerfonate (INN)
sodium tyropanoate (INN)
sodium v
Sodium Versenate

sof-sol
sofalcone (INN)
Sofarin
sofigatran (USAN)
sofinicline (USAN, INN)
Soflax
Sofra-Tulle
sograzepide (USAN)
solabegron (INN)
Solage 
solanezumab (USAN, INN)
Solaquin
Solaraze 
Solarcaine
solasulfone (INN)
Solatene 
Solfoton
Solganal
solifenacin succinate (USAN)
Soliris
solithromycin (USAN, INN)
solpecainol (INN)
Solu-Cortef 
Solu-Medrol 
Solugel
Soluvite
solypertine (INN)

som-son
Soma (Meda Pharmaceuticals)
somagrebove (INN)
somalapor (INN)
somantadine (INN)
somatorelin (INN)
somatosalm (INN)
somatostatin (INN)
somatrem (INN)
somatropin (INN)
somatropin pegol (INN)
Somavert 
somavubove (INN)
somenopor (INN)
sometribove stilbazium iodide (INN)
sometripor stilonium iodide (INN)
somfasepor (INN)
somidobove (INN)
Sominex
Somnote
Somophyllin 
Sonata 
Sonazine 
sonedonoson (INN)
sonepcizumab (INN)
sonermin (INN)
Sonorx
sontuzumab (INN)

sop-sos
sopitazine (INN)
sopromidine (INN)
soquinolol (INN)
sorafenib (USAN)
sorbinicate (INN)
sorbinil (INN)
sorbitan laurate (INN)
sorbitan oleate (INN)
sorbitan palmitate (INN)
sorbitan sesquioleate (INN)
sorbitan stearate (INN)
sorbitan trioleate (INN)
sorbitan tristearate (INN)
Sorbitrate 
soretolide (INN)
Soriatane 
Sorine 
sorivudine (INN)
sornidipine (INN)
Sosol

sot-soy
Sotahexal (Hexal Australia) [Au]. Redirects to sotalol.
sotalol (INN)
sotatercept (USAN, INN)
soterenol (INN)
sothrombomodulin alfa (INN, USAN)
sotirimod (USAN)
Sotradecol 
sotrastaurin (USAN)
Sotret 
Soxazole 
Soy-Dome 
Soyacal